Ritva Nikkilä (born 1961) is a Finnish retired Paralympic swimmer who competed at international swimming competitions. She was a Paralympic champion and competed at the 1988 and 1992 Summer Paralympics.

Personal life
Nikkilä was born in 1961 in a small family farm in Savitaipale, South Karelia, she was the middle child of five children: she grew up with four brothers, two older and two younger. She was born with two fingers on each hand and her right leg is shorter than her left leg. She underwent twenty corrective surgeries on her lower and upper limbs to improve mobility, she had a prosthetic limb when she was three years old. While living in a house in the countryside, she followed her brothers' footsteps and they all learned to swim at a nearby beach, Ritva became very attached to swimming from a young age. As well as swimming, she learned to knit and crochet at school.

Swimming career
Nikkilä began to swim competitively at the age of nineteen, she participated at the 1988 Summer Paralympics in her twenties and won a gold medal in the backstroke and silver and bronze medals in the freestyle. She then won a silver medal at the 1992 Summer Paralympics, after which she stopped competitive swimming to focus on studying social care at University of Kuopio.

References

1961 births
Living people
People from Savitaipale
Paralympic swimmers of Finland
Finnish female freestyle swimmers
Finnish female backstroke swimmers
S5-classified Paralympic swimmers
Swimmers at the 1988 Summer Paralympics
Swimmers at the 1992 Summer Paralympics
Medalists at the 1988 Summer Paralympics
Medalists at the 1992 Summer Paralympics